Charles Harry Spalding (October 13, 1893 – February 3, 1950) was an American soccer and baseball player. 'C.H.', as he also was nicknamed, played the first two games in the history of the U.S. national soccer team and competed in professional soccer for nearly fifteen years, primarily with teams based in Pennsylvania. Besides, Spalding spent two seasons in Major League baseball and later served as a first base coach. A lifelong resident of Philadelphia, he was inducted into the National Soccer Hall of Fame in 1951.

Soccer

Club career
Spalding attended the Northeast Manual Training School in Philadelphia, where he was a multi-sport athlete.  He then went on to play soccer with the Lighthouse Boys Club as well as several other local Philadelphia clubs.  In 1916, when called into the U.S. national team, he was with the Disston A.A.  In the fall of 1916, he signed with Bethlehem Steel F.C. of the National Association Football League (NAFBL).  However, he injured his knee and did not play consistently until January 1917.  In November 1919, he signed with Philadelphia Merchant Ship of the NAFBL.  In 1921, he joined the Harrison S.C. of the American Soccer League (ASL).   He then spent the 1924–1925 ASL season with Fleisher Yarn.

National team
In 1916, the United States Football Association (USFA) recruited a team, called the All-American Soccer Football Team, to represent the U.S. on a tour of Scandinavian countries.  At the time, these countries and the U.S. were all neutral during the ongoing World War I.  During the six game tour, the U.S. played two recognized international games, one on August 21, 1916, against Sweden and another on September 3, 1916, against Norway.  There are disagreements about who scored the first national team goals.  While the National Soccer Hall of Fame lists Spalding, other sources state that Thomas Swords scored an unassisted goal against Sweden.  After this tour, Spalding never played for the U.S. again.

He was inducted into the National Soccer Hall of Fame in 1950.

Baseball

Player
In addition to his soccer career, Spalding was also a successful baseball player.  In 1916, while a member of the U.S. national soccer team, he played in a baseball game against a Swedish baseball team from Västerås.  In 1927, he signed as an outfielder the National League Philadelphia Phillies.  In 1928, he moved to the Washington Senators of the American League.  Spalding also spent time in the International League where he played for the Rochester Red Wings and the Buffalo Bisons.

First Base Coach
Spalding's friendship with Jimmie Wilson led to two stints as a first base coach.  In 1934, Wilson hired Spalding as the first base coach for the Philadelphia Phillies.  In 1941, he was brought into the Chicago Cubs, again by Wilson, to become the Cubs’ first base coach.

Spalding died after a long illness in Philadelphia at the age of 56.

External links
 
 Baseball stats

1893 births
1950 deaths
United States men's international soccer players
Lighthouse Boys Club players
National Association Football League players
Bethlehem Steel F.C. (1907–1930) players
Buffalo Bisons (minor league) players
Disston A.A. players
Philadelphia Merchant Ship players
American Soccer League (1921–1933) players
Harrison S.C. players
Fleisher Yarn players
National Soccer Hall of Fame members
Baseball players from Philadelphia
Major League Baseball outfielders
Philadelphia Phillies players
Rochester Red Wings players
Washington Senators (1901–1960) players
Chicago Cubs coaches
Philadelphia Phillies coaches
Major League Baseball first base coaches
Chicago Cubs scouts
American soccer players
Soccer players from Philadelphia
Association football defenders